Saheb Khan Barani (also Romanized as Şāḩeb Khān Bārānī; also known as Deh-e Şāḩeb Khān and Şāḩeb Khān) is a village in Margan Rural District, in the Central District of Hirmand County, Sistan and Baluchestan Province, Iran. At the 2006 census, its population was 50, in 10 families.

References 

Populated places in Hirmand County